Santiago Scotto Padín (born 26 April 1997) is a Uruguayan professional footballer who plays as a midfielder for Defensor Sporting, on loan from Ecuadorian Serie A club L.D.U. Quito.

Career
A former youth academy player of River Plate Montevideo, Scotto joined Montevideo City Torque in January 2018. He made his professional debut for the club on 4 March 2018 in a 2–2 draw against River Plate.

On 31 July 2021, Scotto joined Ecuadorian Serie A club L.D.U. Quito.

Career statistics

Honours
Montevideo City Torque
 Uruguayan Segunda División: 2019

Defensor Sporting
 Copa Uruguay: 2022

References

External links
 

1997 births
Living people
Footballers from Montevideo
Association football midfielders
Uruguayan footballers
Uruguayan Primera División players
Uruguayan Segunda División players
Ecuadorian Serie A players
Montevideo City Torque players
L.D.U. Quito footballers
Uruguayan expatriate footballers
Uruguayan expatriate sportspeople in Ecuador
Expatriate footballers in Ecuador